A positronic brain is a fictional technological device, originally conceived by science fiction writer Isaac Asimov.  It functions as a central processing unit (CPU) for robots, and, in some unspecified way, provides them with a form of consciousness recognizable to humans.  When Asimov wrote his first robot stories in 1939 and 1940, the positron was a newly discovered particle, and so the buzz word "positronic" added a scientific connotation to the concept. Asimov's 1942 short story "Runaround" elaborates his fictional Three Laws of Robotics, which are ingrained in the positronic brains of nearly all of his robots.

Conceptual overview
Asimov remained vague about the technical details of positronic brains except to assert that their substructure was formed from an alloy of platinum and iridium. They were said to be vulnerable to radiation and apparently involve a type of volatile memory (since robots in storage required a power source keeping their brains "alive"). The focus of Asimov's stories was directed more towards the software of robots—such as the Three Laws of Robotics—than the hardware in which it was implemented, although it is stated in his stories that to create a positronic brain without the Three Laws, it would have been necessary to spend years redesigning the fundamental approach towards the brain itself.

Within his stories of robotics on Earth and their development by U.S. Robots, Asimov's positronic brain is less of a plot device and more of a technological item worthy of study.

A positronic brain cannot ordinarily be built without incorporating the Three Laws; any modification thereof would drastically modify robot behavior. Behavioral dilemmas resulting from conflicting potentials set by inexperienced and/or malicious users of the robot for the Three Laws make up the bulk of Asimov's stories concerning robots. They are resolved by applying the science of logic and psychology together with mathematics, the supreme solution finder being Dr. Susan Calvin, Chief Robopsychologist of U.S. Robots.

The Three Laws are also a bottleneck in brain sophistication. Very complex brains designed to handle world economy interpret the First Law in an expanded sense to include humanity as opposed to a single human; in Asimov's later works like Robots and Empire this is referred to as the "Zeroth Law". At least one brain constructed as a calculating machine, as opposed to being a robot control circuit, was designed to have a flexible, childlike personality so that it was able to pursue difficult problems without the Three Laws inhibiting it completely. Specialized brains created for overseeing world economics were stated to have no personality at all.

Under specific conditions, the Three Laws can be obviated, with the modification of the actual robotic design.
 Robots that are of low enough value can have the Third Law deleted; they do not have to protect themselves from harm, and the brain size can be reduced by half.
 Robots that do not require orders from a human being may have the Second Law deleted, and therefore require smaller brains again, providing they do not require the Third Law.
 Robots that are disposable, cannot receive orders from a human being and are not able to harm a human, will not require even the First Law. The sophistication of positronic circuitry renders a brain so small that it could comfortably fit within the skull of an insect.

Robots of the latter type directly parallel contemporary industrial robotics practice, though real-life robots do contain safety sensors and systems (a weak form of the First Law; the robot is a safe tool to use, but has no "judgment", which is implicit in Asimov's own stories).

In Allen's trilogy
Several robot stories have been written by other authors after Asimov's death.  For example, in Roger MacBride Allen's Caliban trilogy, a Spacer roboticist called Gubber Anshaw invents the gravitonic brain. It offers speed and capacity improvements over traditional positronic designs, but the strong influence of tradition make robotics labs reject Anshaw's work. Only one roboticist, Fredda Leving, chooses to adopt gravitonics, because it offers her a blank slate on which she could explore alternatives to the Three Laws.  Because they are not dependent upon centuries of earlier research, gravitonic brains can be programmed with the standard Laws, variations of the Laws, or even empty pathways which specify no Laws at all.

References in other fiction and films

Abbott and Costello Go To Mars 
In the 1953 film Abbott and Costello Go To Mars, when Queen Allura of Venus (Mari Blanchard) puts Orville (Lou Costello) to a lie detector test in an ESP-enabled crystal chair, she states that it is "based on the principle of the Positronic Brain."

The Avengers 
In a mini story entitled "Night Vision!" in Annual #6 of the Marvel comic, writer Scot Edelman refers to the brain of the synthezoid "The Vision" as positronic. The Vision had a complicated history, being born of the dead android body of the original Human Torch, and the mind of the dead human Wonder Man, not to mention being programmed to be a killing machine by the armageddon-happy sentient robot Ultron, who in his turn had been inadvertently created by scientist Henry Pym, originally as a lab assistant. He overcame his programming and became a hero, but The Vision was always alternately coldly logical and given to violent emotion, and was able to break all three laws.

Doctor Who 

In the fourth season (1966–67) Doctor Who story "The Power of the Daleks", second incarnation of the Doctor, played by Patrick Troughton, awakens from his first regeneration and eventually faces one of his old nemeses, the Daleks. Human space colonists examine "dead" Daleks and, upon their re-activation, conjecture as to "what sort of positronic brain must this device possess". However, the Daleks are actually organic life-forms that were encased in robotic shells, and thus do not possess the purported positronic brain and, in any case, do not obey the Three Laws of Robotics.

In the seventeenth season (1979–80) story "The Horns of Nimon", the fourth incarnation of the Doctor, played by Tom Baker, recognizes the Labyrinth-like building complex that serves as the lair of the Nimons as resembling both physically and functionally a "giant positronic circuit". When adequately fueled, the circuit was capable of transferring massive amounts of energy over vast distances to generate two black holes as gateways to hyperspace and to sustain a tunnel that served as the motive power between them for the transport of an invading force of Nimons from the dying planet Crinoth to Skonnos.

In the fifth series (2010) Doctor Who story "Victory of the Daleks", the Daleks create a human-cyborg scientist "Bracewell", that is implanted in to the British scientific community to develop technology for the war effort. The creation was said to be controlled by a positronic brain.

Star Trek
Several fictional characters in Star Trek: The Next Generation—Lieutenant Commander Data, his "mother" Julianna Soong Tainer, his daughter Lal, and his brothers Lore and B-4—are androids equipped with positronic brains created by Dr. Noonien Soong.

None of these androids are constrained by Asimov's robot laws: Lore, lacking ethics and morals, kills indiscriminately; and Data, though his actions are restricted by ethical programming provided by his creator, is also capable of killing in situations where it is absolutely necessary (exactly what constitutes "absolutely necessary" also being determined by him). Also, Data is not required to obey all orders from humans. He only obeys orders in his duties as a Starfleet officer.

"Positronic implants" were used to replace lost function in Vedek Bareil's brain in the Deep Space 9 episode "Life Support", but this was described by Bareil as having a negative effect on his emotional state, as he felt increasingly numb as more changes were made.

Perry Rhodan 
In the German science fiction series Perry Rhodan (written starting in 1961), positronic brains (German: Positroniken) are the main computer technology; for quite a time they are replaced by the more powerful Syntronics, but those stop working due to the increased Hyperimpedance. The most powerful positronic brain is called NATHAN and covers large parts of the Earth's moon. Many of the larger computers (including NATHAN) as well as the race of Posbis combine a biological component with the positronic brain, giving them sentience and creativity.

I, Robot
The robots in the 2004 film I, Robot (loosely based upon several of Isaac Asimov's stories) also have positronic brains. Sonny, one of the main characters from the film, has two separate positronic brains—the second being a positronic "heart"—so it has choices open to him the other robots in the film do not have. Sonny also has the possibility of being able to develop emotions and a sense of right and wrong independent of the Three Laws of Robotics; it has the ability to choose not to obey them.

The film also features a colossal positronic brain, VIKI, who is bound by the Three Laws. Its interpretation of the laws allows VIKI to directly harm humans to protect humanity as a whole in an application of the Zeroth Law.

Bicentennial Man
The robots in the 1999 film Bicentennial Man (based on one of Asimov's stories) also have positronic brains, including the main character Andrew, an NDR series robot that starts to experience human characteristics such as creativity. Only when Andrew allows his positronic brain to "decay", thereby willfully abandoning his immortality, is he declared a human being.

Buck Rogers in the 25th Century
Twiki and Crichton, two robotic characters who appear in the Buck Rogers in the 25th Century television series, were equipped with positronic brains. Crichton recited Asimov's "Three Laws of Robotics" upon activation.

Mystery Science Theater 3000
In 1989, in the Mystery Science Theater 3000 Season One episode The Corpse Vanishes, Crow T. Robot and Tom Servo read an issue of Tiger Bot magazine featuring an interview with the Star Trek character, Data. They then lament the fact that they don't have positronic brains like him.

Spectreman
In the second episode, Spectreman's robot head is found and viewers discover he is a robot with a positronic brain.

Stellaris
The game Stellaris features Positronic Artificial Intelligence as a possible research goal, which is employed with "Synthetics" (sentient robotic beings) and sentient computers for usage in research, administration, combat etc.

Space Station 13
In the game Space Station 13, players can research and construct positronic brains, and place them inside of AIs, cyborgs and even mechas.

Deep Rock Galactic
The game Deep Rock Galactic features the currently unnamed "Rival Corporation", a fully robotic antagonist corporation to the four player-driven Dwarven miners of Deep Rock Galactic, the titular company the players are employed with. The Rival's many robotic drones include a "Patrol Bot" as its primary frontline combat machine, and has a chance to be disabled in combat, leaving it vulnerable to an optional hacking minigame initiated by the players. Succeeding in this hacking minigame will convert the bot into a temporary ally, and the players voice lines will occasionally comment on their skill at navigating a "Positronic Matrix". The minigame gives an insight into the supposed Positron-based hardware of the bots, which resembles conventional wires, circuitry and other modern computer hardware.

Further reading
An Asimov Companion: Characters, Places and Terms in the Robot/Empire/Foundation Metaseries by Donald E. Palumbo, McFarland (2016)
Science Fiction and Futurism: Their Terms and Ideas by Ace G. Pilkington, McFarland (2017)
Chaos Theory, Asimov's Foundations and Robots, and Herbert's Dune: The Fractal Aesthetic of Epic Science Fiction by Donald Palumbo, Greenwood Press (2002)
"My Robots", essay by Isaac Asimov first published by Ace Books as an introduction to "Isaac Asimov's Robot City" (1987)
Isaac Asimov by William F. Touponce, Twayne Publishers (1991)
The Unauthorized Trekkers' Guide to The Next Generation and Deep Space Nine by James Van Hise, HarperPrism (1995)

References

External links

Doctor Who devices
Fictional computers
Foundation universe
Star Trek devices
Fictional elements introduced in 1939